Radmila Perišić is a Serbian judoka born on April 24, 1980 in Novi Sad, Serbia. She has been practicing Judo since she was 7 years old.

Achievements

References

Year of birth missing (living people)
Living people
Serbian female judoka
Sportspeople from Novi Sad
21st-century Serbian women